The Man with the Hispano (French: L'homme à l'Hispano) is a 1933 French drama film directed by Jean Epstein and starring Jean Murat, Marie Bell and Joan Helda. The title refers to a luxury Hispano-Suiza car. It was based on a novel of the same title by Pierre Frondaie and had previously been made as a silent film The Man with the Hispano in 1926.

The film's sets were designed by the art director Georges Wakhévitch.

Cast
 Jean Murat as Gaston Dewalter 
 Marie Bell as Stéphane Oswill 
 Joan Helda as Mme Deléone 
 Gaston Mauger as M. Deléone 
 Louis Gauthier as Maître Montnormand 
 Blanche Beaume as La gouvernante 
 George Grossmith Jr. as Lord Oswill

References

Bibliography 
 Goble, Alan. The Complete Index to Literary Sources in Film. Walter de Gruyter, 1999.

External links 
 

1933 films
1930s French-language films
Films directed by Jean Epstein
1933 drama films
French drama films
Films based on French novels
Remakes of French films
Sound film remakes of silent films
French black-and-white films
1930s French films